Chubanluy-e Sofla (also Romanized as Chūbānlūy-e Soflá; also known as Chūpānlū-ye Pā’īn, Chūpānlū-ye Soflá, and Ḩeydarābād) is a village in Lakestan Rural District, in the Central District of Salmas County, West Azerbaijan Province, Iran. At the 2006 census, its population was 159, in 35 families.

References 

Populated places in Salmas County